Lasianthus strigosus is a species of plant in the family Rubiaceae. It is endemic to Sri Lanka.

Culture
It is known as "වල් කෝපි - wild coffee" in Sinhala.

References

Flora of Sri Lanka
strigosus